The first of two 1896 municipal elections was held January 13, 1896 to elect the town council (consisting of a mayor and six aldermen, each elected for a one-year term), five trustees for the public school division and four trustees for the separate school division.

Voter turnout

Voter turnout figures for the January 1896 municipal election are no longer available.

Results

(bold indicates elected, italics indicate incumbent)

Mayor

Herbert Charles Wilson was acclaimed for a second term.

Aldermen

 Matthew McCauley - 144
 William S. Edmiston - 142
 Thomas Bellamy - 136
 Isaac Cowie - 127
 Charles Sutter - 116
 John Kelly - 103
 Joseph Henri Picard - 98
 Colin Strang - 75

Public school trustees

Thomas Bellamy, John Cameron, J McBride, Matthew McCauley, and Frank Oliver were elected.  Detailed results are no longer available.

Separate (Catholic) school trustees

N D Beck, Sandy Larue, Antonio Prince, and Georges Roy were elected.  Detailed results are no longer available.

References

City of Edmonton: Edmonton Elections

1896-01
1896 elections in Canada
1896 in Alberta
January 1896 events